The Palais des Sports Hamou Boutlélis, famously called Palais des Sports, is an indoor sports arena located in Oran, Algeria. The official seating capacity of the arena is 5,000.

History
The hall was opened in December 1960 in Medina Jedida, a neighborhood of Oran under the French Algeria period. It hosted many events, the most important were the 1988 African Handball Cup Winners' Cup, the 2005 FIVB Volleyball Boys' U19 World Championship and the qualification tournament of the 2012 FIVB World Grand Prix.

Sports hosted

Collective sports
Futsal, Handball, Basket-ball, Volley-ball.

Individual sports
Martial arts (Karate, Judo, Kickboxing ...etc.), Boxing, Gymnastic.

References

External links
Oran - Infrastructures sportives - Palais des sports «Hamou Boutlélis»

Indoor arenas in Algeria
Volleyball venues in Algeria
Basketball venues in Algeria
Handball venues in Algeria
Sports venues in Oran
1960 establishments in Algeria
Sports venues completed in 1960